Francesco Martelli (1633 – 28 September 1717) was an Italian Roman Catholic Cardinal.

Biography
Martelli was born in Florence of a patrician family.

He studied canon and civil law in the University of Pisa and became canon of the cathedral chapter of Florence. Later he was made relator of the Sacred Congregation of good government in the pontificate of Pope Clement IX. Then he was appointed referendary of the Tribunals of the Apostolic Signature of Justice and of Grace and governor of Faenza (later of Spoleto and vice-legate in Ferrara). He was ordained priest on 8 September 1675.

He was elected titular Latin Archbishop of Corinth on 9 September 1675. On 20 September 1675 was appointed Apostolic nuncio in Poland. Martelli obtained the title of secretary in the Roman Curia by  Pope Innocent XI. On 21 July 1698 he was promoted to the titular patriarchate of Jerusalem.

Francesco Martelli was created cardinal priest in the consistory of 17 May 1706 by Pope Clement XI with the title of Sant'Eusebio. He retired because of gout and died in 1717 in Rome. His funeral monument is in the Martelli Chapel of the church of Santi Michele e Gaetano, Florence. His nephew, Domenico Martelli (1672-1753), was an abbot and prominent art collector.

Episcopal succession

References

External links

1633 births
1717 deaths
Clergy from Florence
17th-century Italian Roman Catholic titular archbishops
18th-century Italian cardinals
Apostolic Nuncios to Poland
Latin archbishops of Corinth
Latin Patriarchs of Jerusalem